Stanford with Orleton is a civil parish in the Malvern Hills district, in the county of Worcestershire, England. The parish comprises the villages of Stanford-on-Teme and Orleton. In 2011 it had a population of 160.

History 
The parish was formed on 1 April 1933 from "Orleton" and "Stanford on Teme" parishes.

Orleton was in the upper division of Doddingtree Hundred.

References

Civil parishes in Worcestershire
Malvern Hills District